was a Japanese economist. He served as the Minister of Education under Prime Minister Tetsu Katayama, and was the first president of Hiroshima University.

Early life and education 
Morito was born in what is now Fukuyama, Hiroshima, Japan on December 23, 1888. He attended , where he was influenced by Nitobe Inazo. He then went on to study at the Tokyo Imperial University, where he studied under Takano Iwasaburo. He graduated in 1914, but became an assistant professor there in 1919.

Career

Morito incident 
Morito was a member of the university's newly-created economics department, and was a member of a Marxist study group. Ōuchi Hyōei, another member of the study group, became the editor of the department's new research journal, and published an article that Morito had submitted. The article was a discussion of Peter Kropotkin's theories and a criticism of Japan's political systems. The Home Ministry made them stop distributing the journal on December 27, 1919, on the grounds that Morito's article advocated for anarchism. Morito refused to apologize for writing the article, so the economics department faculty voted to suspend both Morito and Ouchi in January 1920. The Home Ministry also took them to court. Despite protests from hundreds of university students, Morito was sentenced to three months in jail. Ouchi was sentenced to a year of probation.

After the incident 
Morito worked at the Ohara Institute until he ran for office in 1946 as a member of the Japan Socialist Party. He was elected, and served as a member of the House of Representatives. He became the Minister of Education under Tetsu Katayama in May 1947, and served in that capacity until October 1948. He became the first president of Hiroshima University from 1950 to 1963. He was awarded the Order of the Sacred Treasure, first class, in 1964, the Person of Cultural Merit in 1971, and the Order of the Rising Sun in 1974.

Morito died on May 28, 1984.

References

External links 

 Morito Tatsuo collection at Hiroshima University
 
1888 births
1984 deaths
Japanese economists
People from Fukuyama, Hiroshima
University of Tokyo alumni
Academic staff of the University of Tokyo
Japanese politicians

Recipients of the Order of the Sacred Treasure, 1st class
Recipients of the Order of the Rising Sun